This page lists notable alumni and former students, faculty, and administrators of the California State University, Los Angeles.

Alumni

Academia

Sal Castro – educator and activist
Edward Diller – Professor of Germanic Languages and Literature, University of Oregon
Jaime Escalante – mathematician and teacher; the subject of the 1988 Academy Award-nominated film Stand and Deliver
Michael S. Harper – first poet laureate of Rhode Island; professor at Brown University
Walter E. Williams – author, economist, and professor at George Mason University
Earl G. Yarbrough – president of Savannah State University
Lixia Zhang – Professor of Computer Science at University of California, Los Angeles; co-founder of the Internet Engineering Task Force; named among 54 notable women in technology by Business Insider

Business
James A. Bell ('97) – CFO of the Boeing Company
Warren Bryant (B.S. Sociology, 1971) – Chairman and CEO of Longs Drugs
Donald Sterling (BA) – former owner of the Los Angeles Clippers
Sultan Ahmed Al Jaber (MBA) – Abu Dhabi National Oil Company CEO and Cabinet Member and Minister of State of the United Arab Emirates

Entertainment
Suzanna Guzmán mezzo soprano, an original associate artists of Los Angeles Opera
Dustin Lee Abraham – producer and screenwriter
Al Anthony – LA area radio personality
Alan Arkin ('52) – actor, received the Academy Award for Best Supporting Actor in Little Miss Sunshine (2006)
Gabe Baltazar – jazz and studio musician
Billy Barty ('49, '75) – actor, activist for Little People rights; appeared in the Ron Howard film Willow
Luis Bonilla – composer, musician
Kara Brock ('98) – television and film actress (The Parkers)
Jack Cooper – composer, arranger, musician
Eric "Bobo" Correa – musician, rap and pop artist
Sam Elliott – actor
Phil Feather – studio musician, multireedist
Barry Gordon ('86) – former president of the Screen Actors Guild, adjunct professor of political science at Cal State LA
Telma Hopkins – actress
Danny House – jazz and studio musician
Daniel Knauf ('82) – screenwriter, producer and director
Ronnie Lang –  jazz and studio musician
Isaac Larian – chief executive officer of MGA Entertainment
Steven Lee – music producer, composer, instrumentalist
Ricardo Lemvo – Congo-born Angolan bandleader, singer of Makina Loca
Tiny Lister – actor, former pro wrestler
Lennie Niehaus – composer, arranger, musician
Edward James Olmos – actor, director
Gil Robertson IV – author, journalist and President of the African American Film Critics Association
Scott Shaw – author, actor, filmmaker, and martial artist
Robin Shou – martial artist and actor
 Phil Snyder (MFA 2012) – voice actor, voice of Disney's Jiminy Cricket in Kingdom Hearts and Disney Home Video, professor at the University of Houston
Cheryl Tiegs – model and actress
Robert Vaughn (BA 1956, MA 1964) – actor
John Williams – jazz and studio musician

Literature
Octavia Butler – science fiction author
Leon Leyson (born Leib Lejzon), author of The Boy on the Wooden Box, Holocaust survivor saved by Oskar Schindler
Lorin Morgan-Richards – author and illustrator, primarily of children's books
Marilyn Reynolds – young adult fiction author
Joseph Wambaugh ('60) – bestselling novelist

Politics
Kelly Seyarto - Serving as a member of the California State Assembly former mayor of Murrieta, California.
Esteban Edward Torres - United States House of Representatives for California's 34th congressional district from 1983-1999.
Michael D. Antonovich – politician, member of the Los Angeles County Board of Supervisors (Fifth District)
Joe Baca – member of United States House of Representatives and former chairman of the Congressional Hispanic Caucus
Lee Baca ('71) – former sheriff of Los Angeles County
Sukhbir Singh Badal –- Deputy Chief Minister of Punjab, India
John J. Benoit – California State Senate
Stephen Cooley ('71) – district attorney, Los Angeles County
Julian C. Dixon – former member of the California State Assembly, former member of Congress
Mervyn Dymally – first foreign-born black Congressman, first black Lt. Governor of California, member of the California State Assembly
Elton Gallegly – former member of United States House of Representatives
Tom LaBonge – Los Angeles City Council
Rosario Marin ('83) – 41st U.S. Treasurer
Ken Mettler – past president of the California Republican Assembly
Juanita Millender-McDonald – member of United States House of Representatives
Lucille Roybal-Allard – member of United States House of Representatives and former chair of the Congressional Hispanic Caucus
Robert A. Underwood – delegate of Guam to the United States House of Representatives
Maxine Waters – member of United States House of Representatives
Diane Watson ('67) – member of the United States House of Representatives and ambassador to Micronesia
Wendy Carrillo – American politician serving in the California State Assembly.
Gloria Molina – former member of the Los Angeles County Board of Supervisors and the Los Angeles County Metropolitan Transportation Authority
Richard Alatorre - Member of the California State Assembly and the Los Angeles City Council.
Evan Freed — attorney, photographer of Robert F. Kennedy

Religion
J. Jon Bruno – Bishop of the Episcopal Diocese of Los Angeles, 2002–

Science

Samuel Durrance (BS 1972, MS 1974) – NASA astronaut (Columbia and Endeavour), astrophysicist, educator
Sy Liebergot – NASA flight controller during Project Apollo, author, space historian

Sports
John Adams – former NFL player
LaVar Ball – former basketball and football player, founder, owner, and CEO of Big Baller Brand, father of Lonzo, LiAngelo, and LaMelo Ball
Mike Burns – professional Major League Baseball pitcher for the Boston Red Sox
Don Davis – former NFL player
Joe Faust – Olympian high jumper, mathematics teacher, aviation publisher, renewal energy researcher (kite energy systems)
Jay Gibbons – professional Major League Baseball former outfielder for the Los Angeles Dodgers and the Baltimore Orioles
Walter Johnson – former National Football League player with the Cleveland Browns
Mitch Johnson – former NFL player
Howard Kindig – former NFL player
Billie Jean King – professional tennis player inducted into the International Tennis Hall of Fame in 1987
Noel Lacey - basketball player - 8th in the NCAA (II) in scoring with 29.1 ppg and led the CCAA in scoring and three point shots made from 1989-1991.
Barry Migliorini – American Basketball Association head coach
Martin Vasquez – head coach of C.D. Chivas USA, in Major League Soccer. The first player to play in both the United States and Mexico's national teams.
Mal Whitfield – gold medalist 1948 London Olympics and 1952 Helsinki Olympics
Frank Zane – professional bodybuilder and teacher

Visual arts
 Hisako Terasaki – artist
 Kent Twitchell ('72) – muralist
 Lisa Diane Wedgeworth — visual artist
 Raul Ruiz - Notably photographed the police aiming tear gas launchers at the Silver Dollar Café, where Ruben Salazar was killed.

Faculty

Melina Abdullah – chair of the Pan-African Studies Department
Daniel Amneus, emeritus professor of English, specializing in Shakespearean textual criticism.
Hal Fishman served as an assistant adjunct professor of political science for two years. Fishman won the Associated Press Television-Radio Association's first-ever Lifetime Achievement Award for his work as a Los Angeles local (KTLA) news anchor.
Ann Garry – Professor Emerita of Philosophy; early pioneer of the field of feminist philosophy.
William M. London, American professor of public health and consumer advocate.
Antony C. Sutton American economist, historian, professor, and writer.
Wirt Williams, American novelist, journalist, and professor of English.

Distinguished Visiting Adjunct Professors
Christopher Isherwood taught a course on Modern English Literature in 1961–1962. A noted author his Berlin Stories was the basis for the Broadway musical and film, Cabaret.
Dorothy Parker taught a course in the English department in 1962–63. Parker, a writer and founding member of the Algonquin Round Table was inducted into the American Academy of Arts and Letters in 1959.
Glenn Wilson Visiting Professor, Summer quarters 1971-72, 1974-75. Pioneer of evolutionary psychology; introduced 2D:4D digit ratio as a marker of prenatal testosterone.

Trustee Professors
 Barry Munitz – 5th chancellor of the California State University system, and 6th president of the University of Houston

References

 01
List of people
Los Angeles people